The 2010 Latvian Figure Skating Championships was held in Riga from 12 to 13 December 2009. Skaters competed in the disciplines of men's singles and ladies' singles.

Guest competitors from Lithuania also participated.

Senior results

Men

Ladies

External links
 2010 Latvian Championships results

2009 in figure skating
Latvian Figure Skating Championships, 2010